IIFL Wealth Management Ltd. is an Indian wealth management firm, headquartered in Mumbai, India. The company has a presence in 7 countries and 23 locations in India. It offers wealth management, asset management, portfolio management services, investment products, treasury services, estate planning and lending among others. The company has been rated as A1+ by rating agencies such as CRISIL and ICRA.

History 
IIFL Wealth was founded in 2008. It operated as a subsidiary of IIFL Holdings, a diversified publicly traded financial services company, backed by Fairfax Financial, until the demerger of the IIFL Group into three separately listed entities, one of which is IIFL Wealth.

The equity shares of IIFL Wealth Management are listed on the Bombay Stock Exchange and National Stock Exchange of India.

In December 2018, IIFL Wealth Management launched the IIFL Wealth Index 2018 series, in partnership with Wealth-X.

Acquisition 
In April 2020, IIFL Wealth completed the acquisition of 100% equity shares of L&T Capital Markets (LTCM), a wholly owned subsidiary of L&T Finance Holdings. The acquisition was for a total cash consideration of 230 crore plus available cash balance of LTCM.

IIFL Wealth Management acquired Ashburton India Equity Opportunities for an undisclosed amount in December 2017.

IIFL Wealth Management acquired non banking finance company Chephis Capital Markets in February 2016.

The company had bought a majority stake in India Alternatives Investment Advisors Pvt Ltd, a PE advisory firm, in April 2014.

Funding 
In June 2018, the company raised  from Ward Ferry, General Atlantic and others.

Ranking 
 A1+ Rated by CRISIL in 2020.
 A1+ Rated by ICRA in 2018.

Subsidiaries 
 IIFL Asset Management Limited
 IIFL Trustee Limited
 IIFL Investment Adviser and Trustee Services Limited
 IIFL Wealth Distribution Services Limited (formerly known as IIFL Distribution Services Limited)
 IIFL Wealth Prime Limited
IIFL Wealth Securities IFSC Limited
IIFL Altiore Advisors Ltd.
IIFL Wealth Portfolio Managers Limited (formerly known as IIFL Portfolio Managers Limited)
IIFL Wealth Capital Markets Limited (formerly known as L&T Capital Markets Limited)
IIFLW CSR Foundation
 IIFL Private Wealth Management (Dubai) Limited
 IIFL Inc
 IIFL Private Wealth Hong Kong Ltd
 IIFL Asset Management (Mauritius) Limited
 IIFL (Asia) Pte. Limited
 IIFL Capital Pte. Limited
 IIFL Securities Pte. Limited
 IIFL Capital (Canada) Limited

References

External links 

 Company Overview of IIFL Wealth Management
 We want to buy growth, not recovery: Karan Bhagat, IIFL Wealth & Asset Management at The Economic Times
 A Wealth of Experience at Business Today (India)

Investment management companies of India
Financial services companies based in Mumbai
Indian companies established in 2008
Companies listed on the National Stock Exchange of India
Companies listed on the Bombay Stock Exchange
2008 establishments in Maharashtra